Blackford is an unincorporated community within Webster County, Kentucky, United States.

References

Unincorporated communities in Webster County, Kentucky
Unincorporated communities in Kentucky